Pancreatic alpha-amylase is an enzyme that in humans is encoded by the AMY2A gene.

Amylases are secreted proteins that hydrolyze 1,4-alpha-glucoside bonds in oligosaccharides and polysaccharides, and thus catalyze the first step in digestion of dietary starch and glycogen. The human genome has a cluster of several amylase genes that are expressed at high levels in either salivary gland or pancreas. This gene encodes an amylase isoenzyme produced by the pancreas.

References

External links

See also
 AMY1A

Further reading